Thesprotia macilenta, the Bolivian grass mantis, is a  species of mantis found in Bolivia, Brazil, Costa Rica, Colombia, and Paraguay.

References

Macilenta
Mantodea of North America
Mantodea of South America
Fauna of Bolivia
Insects of Brazil
Arthropods of Colombia
Insects of Central America
Fauna of Paraguay
Insects of South America
Insects described in 1894